Shabdavedhi is a 2000 Kannada-language action drama film directed by S. Narayan and produced by Sri Bhargavi Arts Combines. It stars Rajkumar, Jayapradha, K. S. Ashwath, Sowcar Janaki, Umashree. The music was composed by Hamsalekha. It  film marked the last acting venture of Rajkumar. The film is based on a novel of same name by Vijay Sasanur. 

Shabdavedhi received mixed reviews from critics where it ran for 25-weeks and became a commercial success at the box office.

Premise 
Sandeep is a strict officer who goes on a crusade against narcotics by creating an army of teenagers after the police department refused to help him in his crusade.

Cast

 Rajkumar as Inspector Sandeep
 Jaya Prada as Vathsala (voice dubbed by B. Jayashree)
 K. S. Ashwath as G. K. Kamalakar, Police Commissioner of Bangalore
 Sowcar Janaki as Sandeep's mother
 Mukhyamantri Chandru as Raghava
 Umashree
 Bhavanishankar as Thammayya Shetty
 M. S. Umesh
 Shobhraj as De Cruz
 Chi. Guru Dutt
 Honnavalli Krishna as Krishna
 Daali as Subbu
 Karibasavaiah
 Renukamma Murugodu
 Rajeev

Production
This film has its credit as the comeback film of Rajkumar after almost six years. This was the first time that S. Narayan, age of 35 directed a film starring the legendary actor. The film was shot locations such as K R Circle in Bangalore, Abhiman Studio on the city's outskirts, Rama Mandira in Rajajinagar, Kashmir.

Mysore's police commissioner Kempaiah has given guidance for star's uniforms in the movie.   
 
The producer of the film had originally planned to have Bhanupriya as the female lead, but she was living abroad having married then. Jayaprada was then chosen as the female lead actor

Soundtrack

Hamsalekha composed the film's background score and the soundtrack, also writing lyrics for it. The soundtrack album consists of six tracks.

Reception
Shabdavedhi received mixed reviews from critics,  but it became a commercial success at the box office.

The film completed 25 week-run in Kapali Theatre and 100 days in many centres across Karnataka.

The first day of release was marked by an incident at Kapali Theatre. A technical snag in the audio system at the theatre reportedly led viewers to ransack the place causing the owners a loss worth 20 lakhs.

References

2000s Kannada-language films
2000 films
Films scored by Hamsalekha
Films directed by S. Narayan
Indian action drama films